Thomas Egan (5 October 1906 – 29 November 1979) was an Australian cricketer. He played one first-class match for New South Wales in 1924/25.

See also
 List of New South Wales representative cricketers

References

External links
 

1906 births
1979 deaths
Australian cricketers
New South Wales cricketers
People from Warren, New South Wales
Cricketers from New South Wales